The Peace Candle of the World, also known as the Scappoose Peace Candle, is an approximately  tower-like structure  in diameter in Scappoose, Oregon, designed to resemble a candle. It was built in 1971 outside what was then the Brock Candles Inc. factory, which burned down in 1990.

The candle was originally built with an actual wick. On May 9, 1971, the town's mayor and Oregon Governor Tom McCall lit the candle with a specially-made 60-foot-long match. President Richard Nixon declined a request to light the candle. Due to difficulties in keeping the candle lit during rainfall, the wick was replaced with a natural gas line up the center of the candle to create a real flame at the top. However, due to environmental concerns and high gas bills, the flame was eventually replaced with an electric neon light flame structure.

The Peace Candle of the World was awarded the Guinness World Record for world's largest candle, but the record was later given to the  wax candle that was featured at the General Art and Industrial Exhibition of Stockholm in 1897. The Scappoose Peace Candle sits on the east side of U.S. Route 30 and is visible from the highway. Each season the candle was re-coated with different colors to match the time of year, with red for Christmas and multiple colors being used in the fall. The wax around the candle was eventually replaced with more durable wax-like substances.

The candle is meant to serve as a symbol for the desire for world peace. During the Christmas season the Scappoose Peace Candle is strewn with strands of Christmas lights. The Scappoose region around the Peace Candle of the World has become more and more developed in recent years, and local residents fear that the candle could be demolished for redevelopment.

In June 2015 the Weather Channel website selected the Peace Candle of the World as the Oregon selection for its "Most Incredible Roadside Attraction in Every State" list.

References

1971 establishments in Oregon
Buildings and structures completed in 1971
Buildings and structures in Columbia County, Oregon
Candles
Novelty buildings in Oregon
Peace monuments and memorials
Roadside attractions in Oregon
Scappoose, Oregon
Tourist attractions in Columbia County, Oregon